Code:Breaker (stylized as CØDE:BREAKER) is a Japanese manga series written and illustrated by Akimine Kamijyo. It was serialized in Kodansha's shōnen manga magazine Weekly Shōnen Magazine from June 2008 to July 2013, with its chapters collected in 26 tankōbon volumes. It tells the story of a high school girl named Sakura Sakurakōji who is trained in martial arts and a male transfer student with mysterious powers named Rei Ōgami. The manga was licensed in North America by Del Rey Manga; only the first two volumes were relesed.

A 13-episode anime television series was broadcast from October to December 2012. The series was licensed by Funimation, which produced an English dub in 2014. The series has since been licensed by Crunchyroll, following its merge with Funimation in 2021.

Plot

Riding the bus one day, Sakura Sakurakōji looks out the window to see people being burned alive with a blue fire as a boy her age remains unharmed and stands over the people. When she goes back to the site the next day, there are no corpses or evidence of any kind of murder, just a small fire. When Sakura goes to class, she discovers the new transfer student is the same boy she saw the day before. Sakura soon learns that he is Rei Ōgami, the sixth "Code: Breaker," a special type of assassin with a strange ability and a member of a secret organization that serves the government.

Media

Manga
Written and illustrated by Akimine Kamijyo, Code:Breaker was serialized in Kodansha's shōnen manga magazine Weekly Shōnen Magazine from June 11, 2008, to July 17, 2013. Kodansha collected its chapters in 26 tankōbon volumes, released from October 17, 2008, to September 17, 2013.

In North America, the manga was licensed for English release by Del Rey Manga; only two volumes were released on July 27 and October 26, 2010.

Volume list

Anime
A 13-episode anime television series, produced by Kinema Citrus and directed by Yasuhiro Irie, was broadcast on MBS, Tokyo MX, TVQ, TVA and BS11 from October 7 to December 30, 2012. Three original animation DVD (OAD) episodes were bundled with the respective 22nd–24th limited-edition volumes of the manga, released from December 17, 2012, to April 17, 2013.

Funimation licensed the series for streaming. An English dub was produced in 2014, and released the series on home video on June 24 of the same year. The series has been since added to Crunchyroll's catalogue, following the announcement that Funimation would be unified under their brand in 2021.

Episode list

Notes

References

External links 
  
  
 

Anime series based on manga
Del Rey Manga
Fiction about superhuman features or abilities
Funimation
Kinema Citrus
Kodansha manga
Shōnen manga
Supernatural anime and manga